Jon Matthew Wells (born 23 September 1978) is an English rugby league pundit who was the Director of Rugby at the Castleford Tigers in the Super League and a former professional rugby league footballer. He debuted at Super League level in 1997, making his final appearance in 2009.

He started as an occasional Sky Sports rugby league pundit in 2011 but became a regular.

He ran a hotel with his wife for a few years and then went onto start a gym in the Harrogate area which is still the case as of 2019.

In 12 March 2018 he became director of rugby at Castleford Tigers.

Background
Jon Wells was born in Wakefield, West Yorkshire, England and played for Sharlston Rovers as an amateur Rugby League player. He is currently living with his 2 daughters and wife.

Career
He was signed by the Castleford Tigers and played in the first team from 1998 onwards.

According to Rugby League project, Wells scored 6 tries in 22 games for the Castleford Tigers in 1998; 10 tries in 31 games in 1999; 14 tries in 29 games in the year 2000 (a career best); 9 tries in 30 games in 2001 and 13 tries in 26 games in 2002.

He also obtained a Law Degree and a master's degree in Criminal Justice Studies during his time at the Tigers.

Jon decided to sign for the Castleford Tigers' main rivals, the Wakefield Trinity Wildcats, who had finished 11th, on a two-year contract for the 2003 and 2004 seasons.

However, the Wakefield Trinity Wildcats remained 11th out of 12, losing 20 out of 28 games in the 2003 Super League VIII and Jon scored only one try in his 25 games, back in round 3.

The Wakefield Trinity Wildcats were looking to make changes to improve their team and the London Broncos would end up making also 11 changes and they arranged to sign Wells.

Jon had a good strike rate in his early years at the London Broncos; he scored 8 tries for the London Broncos in 22 games in 2004 and followed that up in 2005 with 13 tries in 27 games in all competitions.

Wells played just six games in 2006 for Harlequins RL, scoring a single try.

In 2007, he played 27 games scoring 7 tries.

In 2008, Jon Wells scored 2 tries in 19 appearances and the last try of his career was against the Hull Kingston Rovers on 5 April 2008.

His last season, 2009, saw Jon play 19 games, without scoring.

Jon had three exceptional seasons on the try scoring front (2000, 2002 and 2005) where he scored about a try every two games; the other seasons he would score a handful of tries and he had four disappointing seasons (2003, 2006, 2008 and 2009) where he scored two or less tries.

Wells' last game for the club was at Hull F.C. on 21 August 2009 where he appears to have sustained a career ending neck injury.

He signed a new contract but at the start of the 2010 Super League XV, he informed Harlequins RL that he was retiring.

A NEW BEGINNING

Jon made very occasional appearance on Sky Sports from about 2010 onwards, as a guest, mainly when the London Broncos were involved.

By 2012, his appearances on Sky were still occasional but becoming a little more frequent.

Around that period he opened hotel with his wife in Harrogate, which was sold on and they switched to running a gym in Harrogate.

Wells was also becoming a regular on Sky albeit in a secondary role; mainly doing brief summaries and presenting segments or holding interviews after the game ended, but on most weeks

By around 2015, the main presenters of Rugby League, looked likely to be heading for retirement; Mike Stephenson was coming up to the age of 70 whilst Eddie Hemmings had been on screen for four decades.

In 2016, "Stevo" retired from his anchor man role opening up further opportunities for others as Sky did not directly replace him.

Wells was Right Time, Right Place and on TV every week, his profile rose, and in 12 March 2018 he unexpectedly became director of rugby at the Castleford Tigers.

Career
By the end of 2009, Wells had made over 250 Super League appearances including 120 for London Broncos/Harlequins RL, 24 appearances for Wakefield Trinity Wildcats and 139 appearances for Castleford Tigers.

Whilst Rob Purdham was the only player in London's history to be awarded a testimonial for ten years of service to the club it was the case that Jon Wells was also awarded a testimonial for 2010, the first player to have been awarded a testimonial by the Rugby Football League (RFL) whilst representing a club in London.

On 12 March 2018 Jon was announced as director of rugby at his hometown club Castleford Tigers and Sky Sports.

References

1978 births
Living people
British sports broadcasters
Castleford Tigers players
English people of American descent
English rugby league players
Hoteliers
London Broncos players
Rugby league centres
English rugby league commentators
Rugby league fullbacks
Rugby league wingers
Rugby league players from Wakefield
Wakefield Trinity players